Basileostylus is a genus of very large, air-breathing land snails, terrestrial pulmonate gastropod molluscs in the family Bothriembryontidae.

Species
 Basileostylus bollonsi (Suter, 1908)

References

 Neubert, E., Chérel-Mora C. & Bouchet P. (2009). Polytypy, clines, and fragmentation: The bulimes of New Caledonia revisited (Pulmonata, Orthalicoidea, Placostylidae). In P. Grancolas (ed.), Zoologia Neocaledonica 7. Biodiversity studies in New Caledonia. Mémoires du Muséum National d'Histoire Naturelle. 198: 37-131

Gastropod genera
Bothriembryontidae